David Pakieto is a New Zealand former rugby league video referee and former referee. An international referee, Pakieto also controlled New Zealand Rugby League matches.

Playing career
Pakieto was a junior with the Otahuhu Leopards and represented Auckland age group teams up to under-18 level. He played with the Leopards' premier side in 1986.

Referee career
As New Zealand's top referee, Pakieto refereed in the 1999 Tri-Nations and at the 2000 World Cup.

Pakieto then became a video referee and was the New Zealand appointee in multiple international matches.

He later served as the Auckland Rugby League Referees president.

References

Year of birth missing (living people)
Living people
New Zealand rugby league referees
New Zealand rugby league players
Otahuhu Leopards players
Rugby League World Cup referees